Ona Carbonell Ballestero (born 5 June 1990) is a Spanish synchronized swimmer.

Carbonell competed at the 2012 Summer Olympics, where she won the silver medal in the women's duet, with Andrea Fuentes, and a bronze medal in the team event.  She competed in the women's duet at the 2016 Summer Olympics, with Gemma Mengual, finishing in fourth place.

During her preparation for the 2020 Summer Olympics, Carbonell gave birth in August 2020. Despite medical advice not to train for six months, Carbonell returned in four weeks and competed at the Olympics, where she came seventh in the team event. A documentary, Starting Over, was made of her grappling with the roles of mother and athlete. In December 2022 she was honored as one of the BBC 100 Women.

References

External links
 
 
 
 

1990 births
Living people
Spanish synchronized swimmers
Olympic synchronized swimmers of Spain
Synchronized swimmers at the 2012 Summer Olympics
Synchronized swimmers at the 2016 Summer Olympics
Synchronized swimmers at the 2020 Summer Olympics
Olympic silver medalists for Spain
Olympic medalists in synchronized swimming
Olympic bronze medalists for Spain
Medalists at the 2012 Summer Olympics
World Aquatics Championships medalists in synchronised swimming
Synchronized swimmers at the 2015 World Aquatics Championships
Synchronized swimmers at the 2011 World Aquatics Championships
Synchronized swimmers at the 2013 World Aquatics Championships
Synchronized swimmers at the 2009 World Aquatics Championships
Synchronized swimmers at the 2007 World Aquatics Championships
Swimmers from Barcelona
Synchronized swimmers at the 2017 World Aquatics Championships
Artistic swimmers at the 2019 World Aquatics Championships
European Aquatics Championships medalists in synchronised swimming
BBC 100 Women